Gracixalus is a genus of shrub frogs (family Rhacophoridae) from south-eastern Asia.

Phylogenetic evidence indicates that it is the sister genus to the genus Vampyrius, which contains the vampire tree frog.

Species
The following species are recognised in the genus Gracixalus:
 Gracixalus ananjevae (Matsui and Orlov, 2004)
 Gracixalus carinensis (Boulenger, 1893)
 Gracixalus gracilipes (Bourret, 1937)
 Gracixalus guangdongensis Wang, Zeng, Liu, and Wang, 2018
 Gracixalus jinggangensis Zeng, Zhao, Chen, Chen, Zhang, and Wang, 2017
 Gracixalus jinxiuensis (Hu, 1978)
 Gracixalus lumarius Rowley, Le, Dau, Hoang & Cao, 2014
 Gracixalus medogensis (Ye & Hu, 1984)
 Gracixalus nonggangensis Mo, Zhang, Luo & Chen, 2013
 Gracixalus quangi (Rowley, Dau, Nguyen, Cao & Nguyen, 2011)
 Gracixalus quyeti (Nguyen, Hendrix, Böhme, Vu & Ziegler, 2008)
 Gracixalus sapaensis Matsui, Ohler, Eto, and Nguyen, 2017
 Gracixalus seesom (Matsui, Khonsue, Panha & Eto, 2015)
 Gracixalus supercornutus (Orlov, Ho & Nguyen, 2004)
 Gracixalus tianlinensis Chen, Bei, Liao, Zhou, and Mo, 2018
Gracixalus trieng 
 Gracixalus yunnanensis Yu, Li, Wang, Rao, Wu, and Yang, 2019

References

 
Rhacophoridae
Amphibians of Asia
Amphibian genera